Arianna Talamona (born 5 June 1994) is an Italian Paralympic swimmer who competes in international level events.

Talamona was diagnosed with Strumpell-Lorrain disease which affects her spinal cord and uses a wheelchair, she has inherited this medical condition from her mother. Talamona started swimming aged eight to help strengthen her muscles and began competing internationally at the 2011 IPC Swimming European Championships in Berlin where she competed in four events but didn't receive medals.

References

External links 
 

1994 births
Living people
Sportspeople from Varese
Paralympic swimmers of Italy
Swimmers at the 2016 Summer Paralympics
Swimmers at the 2020 Summer Paralympics
Italian female backstroke swimmers
Italian female breaststroke swimmers
Italian female butterfly swimmers
Italian female freestyle swimmers
Italian female medley swimmers
Medalists at the World Para Swimming Championships
Medalists at the World Para Swimming European Championships
S5-classified Paralympic swimmers
21st-century Italian women